Chromos is the second novel of Spanish-born American writer Felipe Alfau (1902–1999), written in 1948 and published in 1990.

Composition and publication

Alfau described how he wrote the novel: "In the office between one document and another, I would write a paragraph or two.  I then pasted together the whole book, as in a collage."  He completed it in 1948, but not published until 1990 when Dalkey Archive Press released the first edition.

Reception and legacy

The novel was nominated for a National Book Award in 1990.

Chromos had an influence on the works of fellow Spanish-American writer Eduardo Lago, whose Llámame Brooklyn shares stylistic, structural, and thematic similarities with Alfau's novel, such as a novel-within-a-novel.

References

Works cited

Further reading

 

1948 American novels
Novels by Felipe Alfau
Dalkey Archive Press books